The 1978–79 Boise State Broncos men's basketball team represented Boise State University during the 1978–79 NCAA Division I men's basketball season. The Broncos were led by sixth-year head coach Bus Connor and played their home games on campus at Bronco Gymnasium in Boise, Idaho.

No Broncos were named to the all-conference team; forward Sean McKenna was on the second team, and guard Fred Williams was honorable mention.

References

External links
Sports Reference – Boise State Broncos – 1978–79 basketball season

Boise State Broncos men's basketball seasons
Boise State
Boise State